Trasi is a place on the west coast of India, 12 km north of Kundapur in Kundapura Taluk, Udupi District.

Turtle beach
Trasi beach is known for migration of turtle for laying eggs.

Christ the King Church
Christ the King Church was elevated to being a full-fledged parish in 1971, prior to which it was a substation of the 'Immaculate Conception of the Blessed Virgin Mary Church' a parish since 1630 in Gangolli to early Goan/Portuguese settlers who migrated south from Goa around 1560.

On arrival, the settlers built a modest church building near the 'Bundar'. On being annexed to Goa in about 1629, the old building made way for a new one and then again to the final church which stands there today.

The parish caters to over 200 families today, who are descendants of the old settlers.

Island
There is a small island of about 100 meters radius which is about a kilometer offshore. This island is called Coral Island.

References

Cities and towns in Udupi district
Beaches of Karnataka